The Patan Buddhist caves are recently discovered rock-cut caves, near Patan, Maharashtra, in the district of Satara. Eleven caves were discovered all together, spread in four different areas of Patan, in Tamkane, Yerphal, Yeradvadi and Digevadi.

The caves are dated to the first half of the 2nd century CE.

References

Lonavala-Khandala
Caves of Maharashtra
Buddhist caves in India
Buddhist monasteries in India
Indian rock-cut architecture
Former populated places in India
Buddhist pilgrimage sites in India
Satara district